Alternative Chassis Engineering was an English vehicle manufacturer established. It produced buses, coaches and fire appliances. It ceased production in 1992.

References

Companies based in Huddersfield
Defunct bus manufacturers of the United Kingdom
Fire service vehicle manufacturers
Vehicle manufacturing companies disestablished in 1992
1980s establishments in England
1992 disestablishments in England
British companies disestablished in 1992